Hawaii is a US state, situated in the Pacific Ocean, and Polynesia.

Hawaii may also refer to:

Places

Astronomical
 48575 Hawaii, an asteroid

Geographical
 Hawaii (island), the largest island in the Hawaiian Islands
 Hawaii County, Hawaii, coextensive with the Island of Hawaii
 Hawaii, California, former name of Haiwee, California
 Cape Hawaii, Wrangel Island

Historical
 Ancient Hawaii
 Kingdom of Hawaii
 Republic of Hawaii
 Territory of Hawaii
 Havai'i, an older name for the island of Raiatea

Art, entertainment, and media

Film
 Hawaii (1966 film), a 1966 film adaptation of Michener's 1959 book
Hawaii (2013 film), a 2013 romantic drama film directed by Marco Berger
"Hawaii" (2017), a Romanian drama about a foreign inheritance, discovered in late 1980s Communist Romania, film directed by Jesús del Cerro

Literature
 Hawaii (novel),  a 1959 novel by James Michener

Music
 Toast Hawaii (record label), a British record label

Groups
 Hawaii (band), a speed/power metal band

Albums
 Hawaii (album), a 1996 album by the High Llamas
 Hawaii (Pete Yorn album), a 2022 album by Pete Yorn

Songs
 "Hawái" (song), a 2020 song by Maluma
 "Hawaii" (Beach Boys song), a 1963 song by the Beach Boys off their Surfer Girl album
 "Hawaii" (Elmer Bernstein song), the theme song from the 1966 film of the same name.
 "Hawaii", a song by Mew on their 2009 album No More Stories...
 "Hawaii", a song by Neil Young on his album Hitchhiker recorded in 1976 and released in 2017
 "Hawaii (Stay Awake)", a single off of Waterparks' 2016 album, Double Dare
 "Hawaii" a B-Side by The Strokes from the single Juicebox.

Television
 "Hawaii" (Modern Family), a 2010 episode of Modern Family
 Hawaii (TV series), a short-lived NBC TV series
 Hawaii Five-O (1968 TV series), a television police drama series, originally aired from 1968 to 1980
 Hawaii Five-0 (2010 TV series), a 2010 television remake

University of Hawaii
 University of Hawaii
 University of Hawaii at Manoa, the main campus of the above university
 Hawaii Rainbow Wahine, women's athletic teams of University of Hawaii at Manoa
 Hawaii Rainbow Warriors, men's athletic teams of University of Hawaii at Manoa

Other uses
 Hawaii (horse) (1964–1990), South African Thoroughbred racehorse
 USS Hawaii, either of two ships of that name in the U.S. Navy
 Toast Hawaii, a type of open ham and cheese sandwich
 Hawaii, code name of high-end AMD Radeon R9 GPU models 290/290X/390/390X (28 nm fab process).
 Pizza hawaii

See also
 
 Hawai (disambiguation)
 Hawaiian (disambiguation)
 Hawaiki